Brigadier General Edward Hinkley Plummer (September 24, 1855 – February 11, 1927) was the Commander of Camp Dodge.

Early life 
He was born on September 24, 1855, in Elkridge, Maryland. He was a cadet at the United States Military Academy from July 1, 1873, to June 14, 1877.

Career 
He was commissioned in the Tenth Infantry and performed frontier duty from 1877 to 1898.

From 1904 to 1907, he commanded Fort Egbert in Eagle, Alaska.

In 1917, he organized and served as the first commander of the Department of the Panama Canal.

He retired on November 30, 1918, at Camp Grant near Rockford, Illinois.

Death and legacy 
He died on February 11, 1927, in Pacific Grove, California. He was buried at the Presidio of Monterey, California.

His papers are held by the Defense Language Institute's Foreign Language Center Archives.

External links

References

United States Military Academy alumni
Burials at Presidio of Monterey, California
1855 births
1927 deaths
United States Army generals of World War I
United States Army generals
United States Army Infantry Branch personnel